Good Morning, Judge is a 1943 American comedy film directed by Jean Yarbrough and starring Dennis O'Keefe, Louise Allbritton and Mary Beth Hughes. When a songwriter is sued for plagiarism, he falls in love with the female lawyer acting against him.

Plot

Cast
 Dennis O'Keefe as David Barton  
 Louise Allbritton as Elizabeth Christine Smith  
 Mary Beth Hughes as Mira Bryon  
 J. Carrol Naish as Andre Bouchard  
 Louise Beavers as Cleo  
 Samuel S. Hinds as J.P. Gordon 
 Frank Faylen as Ben Pollard  
 Ralph Peters as Harry Pollard  
 Oscar O'Shea as Magistrate  
 William Forrest as Judge William Foster  
 Marie Blake as Nicky Clark  
 Don Barclay as Biscuit Face

References

Bibliography
 Elizabeth Leese. Costume Design in the Movies. Courier Corporation, 1991.

External links
 

1943 films
1943 comedy films
1940s English-language films
American comedy films
Films directed by Jean Yarbrough
Universal Pictures films
American black-and-white films
1940s American films